Hollywood Stadium Mystery is a 1938 American film directed by David Howard.

Plot

A rivalry develops between a district attorney named Devons, who finds murder mysteries amusing but amateurish, and Pauline Ward, a crime novelist. They play tricks on one another, attempting to prove their point over how to solve a crime. 
 
One night before a prizefight, when the lights are momentarily dimmed, a boxer is suddenly killed in the ring. The only clue Devons and Ward have is a tune that a man was whistling. The police detain every spectator from ringside, considering them all as suspects, including Edna Mayberry, a woman who had an involvement with the dead fighter. Pauline is threatened in a dressing room before the case is solved.

Cast
Neil Hamilton as Bill Devons
Evelyn Venable as Pauline Ward
Jimmy Wallington as Nick Nicholls
Barbara Pepper as Althea Ames
Lucien Littlefield as Watchman
Lynne Roberts as Edna Mayberry
Charles Williams as Jake
James Spottswood as Albert "Slats" Keefe
Reed Hadley as Ralph Mortimer
Robert Homans as Captain Joseph Filsom
William Haade as Tommy Madison - the Champ
Pat Flaherty as Ace Cummings
Dan Tobey as Announcer Dan Tobey
Al Bayne as Max
Smiley Burnette as Smiley Burnette

Soundtrack
"She'll Be Coming 'Round the Mountain"

External links

1938 films
American boxing films
American mystery films
American black-and-white films
1930s romance films
Republic Pictures films
Films directed by David Howard
American romance films
1930s mystery films
1930s English-language films
1930s American films